Samuel Kaloros (born 16 September 1989) is a Vanuatuan footballer who plays as a defender for Erakor Golden Star in the Port Vila Football League and the Vanuatu national football team. He made his debut for the national team on March 26, 2016 in their 2–1 victory against New Caledonia.

References

External links
 

1989 births
Living people
Vanuatuan footballers
Vanuatu international footballers
Association football defenders
Erakor Golden Star F.C. players
Spirit 08 F.C. players
2016 OFC Nations Cup players